The Midnight Special is an American late-night musical variety series originally broadcast on NBC during the 1970s and early 1980s, created and produced by Burt Sugarman. It premiered as a special on August 19, 1972, then began its run as a regular series on February 2, 1973; its last episode was on May 1, 1981. The 90-minute program followed the Friday night edition of The Tonight Show Starring Johnny Carson.

Like its syndicated late-night cousin Don Kirshner's Rock Concert, the show typically featured guest hosts, except for a period from July 1975 through March 1976 when singer Helen Reddy served as the regular host. Wolfman Jack served as the announcer and frequent guest host. The program's theme song, a traditional folk song called "Midnight Special", was performed by Johnny Rivers.

The Midnight Special was noted for featuring musical acts performing live, which was unusual since most television appearances during the era showed performers lip-synching to prerecorded music. The series also occasionally aired vintage footage of older acts, such as Bill Haley & His Comets. The program also featured occasional performances of comedians such as Richard Pryor, Andy Kaufman, and George Carlin.

History

In 1972, producer Burt Sugarman pitched the program as a means for NBC to capitalize on The Tonight Shows large audience. At the time, none of the Big Three television networks had programming on after 1:00 am Eastern time, as common practice by most stations was to sign off after the final program. Despite a lack of competition in that timeslot, NBC initially rejected the idea. The rejection led Sugarman to buy the air time for the premiere on his own as a brokered show, convincing Chevrolet to become the show's first sponsor. It premiered with ratings high enough for NBC to reconsider its decision, and the network subsequently bought the program. NBC also reasoned that the additional weekly hour and a half of programming would allow NBC to recoup some revenue lost as a result of the Public Health Cigarette Smoking Act, which banned the advertising of tobacco on television effective January 1, 1971. The program remained a part of NBC's late-night lineup until 1981.

The pilot for the series aired on August 19, 1972. It was presented as a 90-minute special encouraging young people to vote in the upcoming Presidential election. Several months later, on February 2, 1973, it premiered as a weekly series. Within eight months of its premiere, The Midnight Special had proven that programming in the later time period was viable, and NBC would expand its programming in the time slot to five days a week with the addition of the talk show Tomorrow, hosted by Tom Snyder, the other four nights.

The Midnight Specials original time slot was from 1:00–2:30 a.m. in the Eastern and Pacific time zones (Midnight to 1:30 a.m. Central and Mountain). When The Tonight Show's run time was shortened from ninety to sixty minutes in September 1980, The Midnight Special was moved to 12:30 a.m. (ET/PT)/11:30 p.m. (CT/MT), maintaining its 90-minute run time.

In 1978, at the height of the disco craze, the set was changed to resemble a disco nightclub complete with a platform dance floor. Wolfman Jack stood behind an elevated DJ booth. By fall 1979, as the genre's popularity waned, the disco set was replaced.

Guest stars

Some notable guest stars and hosts included: 
ABBA 
AC/DC 
Aerosmith
America 
Aretha Franklin 
New Birth 
Badfinger
The Bay City Rollers
The Beach Boys 
The Bee Gees 
Chuck Berry 
Blondie 
David Bowie 
Bread 
Brooklyn Dreams 
James Brown 
The Cars 
The Chambers Brothers 
Jerry Bell
Ray Charles 
Cheap Trick 
Lou Christie
Petula Clark 
Jim Croce 
Billy Crystal 
Bo Diddley 
The Doobie Brothers
Earth, Wind & Fire
Electric Light Orchestra 
Mama Cass Elliot 
Jose Feliciano 
Fleetwood Mac 
Flo & Eddie
Peter Frampton
Frankie Valli and the Four Seasons 
Marvin Gaye 
Genesis
Andy Gibb
Lesley Gore
Gladys Knight & The Pips
Golden Earring
Goldstar 
Al Green 
The Guess Who
Heart 
Janis Ian 
Wolfman Jack 
The Jackson 5 
Rick James 
Billy Joel 
Elton John 
Journey 
KC and the Sunshine Band 
Andy Kaufman 
B.B. King 
Kiss 
Kris Kristofferson 
Jerry Lee Lewis 
Gordon Lightfoot  
Little Feat  
Loggins & Messina 
Barry Manilow 
Steve Martin 
Eddie Money 
Van Morrison 
Randy Newman 
Olivia Newton-John
The New York Dolls
Ted Nugent 
The O'Jays
Dolly Parton 
Prince
Richard Pryor
Robert Fripp 
Helen Reddy 
REO Speedwagon
Minnie Riperton
Linda Ronstadt
Lynn Anderson
Rare Earth
Roxy Music 
Diana Ross 
T. Rex
Rufus 
Todd Rundgren
The Shadows of Knight 
The Spinners 
The Sylvers 
Steely Dan 
Rod Stewart
Sugarloaf 
Donna Summer 
Tom Petty and the Heartbreakers 
The Three Degrees
Thin Lizzy  
Ike & Tina Turner Revue
Village People 
War 
Jennifer Warnes
Weather Report
Barry White
XTC 
Gary Wright
Shirley and Lee - (nb * below)

ELO had more appearances than any other band with seven.
Shirley and Lee were introduced in 1974 singing 'Let the Good Times Roll', when actually 'Lee' wasn't on stage; 'Shirley' was singing with Steeltown Records Founder and Hollywood Shuffle actor  Lou 'Ludie' Washington.
The show presented The 1980 Floor Show, the last performance of David Bowie as Ziggy Stardust. It was broadcast on November 16, 1973, and was taped a month earlier from specially-commissioned performances at the Marquee Club in Soho, London.

Cancellation
The series was canceled by NBC at the request of Dick Ebersol as part of a deal for him to take over the then-ailing Saturday Night Live. Because there was no time for NBC to develop a new show from scratch in light of the urgent SNL situation, The Midnight Special was replaced by SCTV, a weekly Canadian sketch comedy series performed by members of the Toronto satellite of Chicago's The Second City improvisational troupe. That program, in turn, would later be replaced with another music show, Friday Night Videos, in 1983, also produced initially by Ebersol.

DVD release
In 2006, a DVD collection entitled Burt Sugarman's Midnight Special was made available by Guthy-Renker through television and radio infomercials. In 2014, an 11-DVD collection entitled The Midnight Special was released by Star-Vista through standard retail channels.

See also
 List of late night network TV programs
 The Midnight Special (radio)

References
Notes

Bibliography
 McNeil, Alexander M. (1980) Total Television, New York: Penguin Books, Ltd.

External links
 

1973 American television series debuts
1981 American television series endings
1970s American late-night television series
1980s American late-night television series
1970s American music television series
1980s American music television series
1970s American variety television series
1980s American variety television series
English-language television shows
NBC original programming
NBC late-night programming
Pop music television series
Rock music television series